The Our Gang personnel page is a listing of the significant cast and crew from the Our Gang short subjects film series, originally created and produced by Hal Roach which ran in movie theaters from 1922 to 1944.
 
The series was produced by Hal Roach Studio's from 1922 until 1938, and from 1938 and 1944 by MGM pictures
After being purchased by MGM studios, the title was changed to The Little Rascals, for subsequent theatrical re-releases from the Roach-produced era, as well as for syndicated television broadcasts starting from 1955.

Our Gang cast

 The series franchise having been produced in various formats, is in general depicted by 3 different eras , The Hal Roach Silent Film era (1922–1929), The Hal Roach Sound era (1929–1938) and the MGM produced era (1938–1944)

Hal Roach silent film period

1922–1926
 Ernie Morrison as Sunshine Sammy
 Jackie Condon
 Mickey Daniels
 Allen Hoskins as Farina
 Peggy Cartwright
 Jack Davis
 Mary Kornman (replaced Peggy after A Quiet Street)
 Andy Samuel
 Joe Cobb as the fat kid
 Jannie "Mango" Hoskins
 Sonny Boy "Sing Joy" Warde
 Eugene Jackson as Pineapple (replaced Ernie Morrison in 1924)
 Johnny Downs
 Pal the Dog
 Dinah the Mule

(1926–1929)
 Allen Hoskins
 Jackie Condon
 Joe Cobb
 Mickey Daniels
 Mary Kornman
 Johnny Downs
 Jannie Hoskins as Mango
 Jay R. Smith (replaced Mickey Daniels in 1926)
 Clifton Young as Bonedust
 Elmer Lowry as Scooter
 Mildred Kornman
 Jean Darling (replaced Mary Kornman in 1926)
 Bobby Hutchins as Wheezer
 Harry Spear (replaced Elmer Lowry (Scooter) in 1927)
 Mary Ann Jackson
 Pete the Pup (called Minnie in at least one film, and Pansy in a handful of other films, offspring of Pal the Pup (above))
 Dinah the Mule
 Henry Hill as Henry

Hal Roach sound era

(1929–1931)
 Allen Hoskins
 Mary Ann Jackson
 Joe Cobb
 Harry Spear
 Jean Darling
 Bobby Hutchins (replaced Jackie Condon in 1929)
 Clifton Young
 Norman Chaney as Chubby (replaced Joe Cobb in 1929)
 Jackie Cooper
 Donald Haines
 Dorothy DeBorba
 Buddy McDonald
 Matthew "Stymie" Beard (joined in 1930, became Allen Hoskins (Farina)'s replacement in 1931)
 Shirley Jean Rickert
 Pete the Pup (the original Pete was poisoned in 1930; trainer Harry Lucenay used Pete's offspring [who all appear in Pups is Pups] in the series after they reached maturity starting in 1931)
 Dinah the Mule

1931–1933
 Matthew Beard as Stymie
 Bobby Hutchins
 Dorothy DeBorba
 Donald Haines
 Sherwood Bailey
 Kendall McComas as Breezy Brisbane (Was Jackie Cooper's replacement until Dickie Moore took over)
 Jerry Tucker
 George McFarland as Spanky
 Dickie Moore (Became Jackie Cooper's replacement)
 Jacquie Lyn
 John Collum as Uh Huh
 Tommy Bond
 Pete the Pup (Dog trainer Harry Lucenay left the Roach studio in 1932; unrelated, dissimilar bulldogs played Pete in subsequent films)

1934–1935
 Matthew Beard 
 Jerry Tucker
 George McFarland
 Tommy Bond (left in 1934, would return in 1937 as "Butch")
 Wally Albright
 Scotty Beckett
 Jackie Lynn Taylor
 Marianne Edwards
 Leonard Kibrick
 Billie Thomas as Buckwheat (joined in 1934, became Matthew Beard (Stymie)'s replacement in 1935)
 Philbrook Lyons
 Alvin Buckelew
 Barbara Goodrich
 Pete the Pup

1935
 George McFarland
 Scotty Beckett
 Billie Thomas as Buckwheat
 Jerry Tucker
 Leonard Kibrick
 Marianne Edwards
 Alvin Buckelew
 Sidney Kibrick
 Carl Switzer as Alfalfa (joined in 1935, became Scotty Beckett's replacement in 1936)
 Harold Switzer as Slim
 Darla Hood
 Eugene Gordon Lee as Porky
 Patsy May
 Barbara Goodrich
 Pete the Pup

1936–1938
 George McFarland
 Carl Switzer
 Billie Thomas
 Darla Hood
 Eugene Gordon Lee
 Tommy Bond as Butch (replaced Leonard Kibrick in 1937)
 Sidney Kibrick as Woim 
 Darwood Kaye as Waldo
 Gary Jasgur as Junior
 Henry "Spike" Lee
 Leonard Landy
 Shirley Coates
 Barbara Goodrich
 Patsy May
 Harold Switzer
 Pete the Pup

MGM period

1938–1939
 George McFarland
 Carl Switzer
 Billie Thomas
 Darla Hood
 Eugene Gordon Lee
 Tommy Bond
 Sidney Kibrick
 Darwood Kaye
 Gary Jasgur
 Leonard Landy
 Shirley Coates as Muggsy
 Harold Switzer

1939–1942
 George McFarland
 Billie Thomas
 Carl Switzer
 Darla Hood
 Shirley Coates
 Leonard Landy
 Harold Switzer
 Mickey Gubitosi (replaced first Junior, and then Porky, in 1939)
 Billy Laughlin as Froggy (joined in 1940, replaced Alfalfa in 1941)
 Janet Burston (made guest appearances from 1940 until she replaced Darla in 1942)

1942–1944
 Billie Thomas
 Billy Laughlin
 Robert Blake as Mickey (actor Gubitosi changed his name in 1942)
 Janet Burston
 Mickey Laughlin as Happy Laughlin
 Violet the Goat

Additional notable Our Gang cast

 Sonny Bupp, a successful child actor; played bit roles in several late-1930s Our Gang shorts, including a prominent role in  Men in Fright (1938)
 Dorothy Dandridge, the first African-American actress to be nominated for the Academy Award for Best Actress; made her film debut as an extra in Teacher's Beau (1935)
 Darryl Hickman, a successful child actor; made a featured guest appearance in Going to Press (1942)
Dwayne Hickman (Darryl's younger brother), later famous as the star of TV's The Many Loves of Dobie Gillis, had a bit part in the short, Melodies Old and New (1942)
 Philip Hurlic, a successful child actor; had small parts in several late-1930s Our Gang shorts, and temporarily took Buckwheat's place as a member of the main cast for  Feed 'em and Weep (1938)
 Leon Janney, a successful actor and radio personality; had a prominent role in Bear Shooters (1930)
 Annabella Logan, later famous as jazz singer Annie Ross, sings one of the musical numbers in Our Gang Follies of 1938
 June Preston, an RKO child actress
 Juanita Quigley, a successful child actress; appeared in two MGM Our Gang shorts as "Sally":  The New Pupil (1940) and Going to Press (1942)

Recurring Our Gang cast

Recurring adult actors
Many of the regular adult actors in Our Gang also frequently appeared in other Hal Roach comedies, including the Charley Chase and Laurel and Hardy series:

 William Gillespie as various characters (1922–1931)
 Helen Gilmore as various characters (1922–1930)
 Charles Stevenson as various characters (1922–1923)
 Dick Gilbert as various characters, notably the kind man at the dog pound in The Pooch (1922–1933)
 Florence Hoskins as various characters, usually Farina's mother (1922–1928)
 Joseph Morrison (also known as Ernie Morrison, Sr.) as various characters, usually Ernie and Farina's father
 Katherine Grant as various characters (1922–1925)
 Richard Daniels as various characters, usually Mickey Daniels' father (1922–1926)
 George B. French as various characters, notably Professor Clements in Thundering Fleas and Professor Fleece in Shivering Spooks (1923–1928)
 Lyle Tayo as various characters, usually one of the kids' mothers (1924–1934)
 Gus Leonard as various characters, notably Old Cap in Mush and Milk and Grandpa Gus in The Lucky Corner (1925–1936)
 Jimmy Finlayson as various characters, most notably the schoolteacher in Seeing the World and Mr. Brown in Mush and Milk (1925–1933)
 Martha Sleeper as various characters (1925–1927)
 Charlie Hall as various characters (1926–1936)
 Charles McAvoy as various characters, notably Jackie Cooper's father in When the Wind Blows (1926–1934)
 Louise Emmons as the headmistress in Bring Home the Turkey and Mush and Milk
 Budd Fine as various characters, notably the dog catcher in The Pooch (1928–1932)
 Otto Fries as various characters, notably the orphan asylum agent in Little Daddy, the blacksmith in Readin' and Writin', and Spanky's father in The Kid from Borneo (1929–1933)
 Edgar Kennedy as Kennedy the cop (1929–1930)
 June Marlowe as Miss Crabtree, the schoolteacher (1930–1932)
 Creighton Hale as various characters, notably Miss Crabtree's brother in School's Out (1930–1932)
 Margaret Mann as the kids' adopted Grandma in Helping Grandma and Fly My Kite (1931)
 May Wallace as various characters, usually one of the kids' mothers (1931–1937)
 Harry Bernard as various characters (1931–1935)
 James Mason as Dan, Grandma's son-in-law in Fly My Kite
 Mae Busch as Dan's new wife in Fly My Kite (1931)
 Johnnie Mae Beard as Stymie's mother in Big Ears and Free Wheeling (1931–1932)
 Billy Gilbert as various characters, notably the sea captain in Shiver My Timbers and Spanky's father in Spanky (1931–1933)
 Estelle Ettere as various characters, notably Dickie Moore's nurse in Free Wheeling
 Lillian Rich as Dickie Moore's mother in Free Wheeling and Birthday Blues (1932)
 James C. Morton as various characters, notably Mr. Morton in Mike Fright and the piano player in Beginner's Luck (1932–1935)
 Emerson Treacy and Gay Seabrook as Spanky's parents in Bedtime Worries and Wild Poses (1933)
 Billy Bletcher as various characters, notably Bill the golfer in Divot Diggers, the voice of the giant in Mama's Little Pirate, and Froggy's father (and the voice of his mother) in Robot Wrecks
 William Wagner as various characters, notably Leonard Kibrick's father in For Pete's Sake! and The Lucky Corner (1934–1936)
 Clarence Wilson as various grouchy characters, most notably Mr. Crutch in Shrimps for a Day. (1934–1941)
 George and Olive Brasno (1934's Shrimps for a Day and 1936's Arbor Day)
 Johnny Arthur as Spanky's father in Anniversary Trouble and Darla's father in Night 'n' Gales and Feed 'em and Weep
 Claudia Dell as Spanky's mother in Mama's Little Pirate and Anniversary Trouble (1935)
 Hattie McDaniel as Buckwheat's mother in Anniversary Trouble and Arbor Day (1935–1936)
 Rosina Lawrence as Miss Lawrence, the schoolteacher (1936–1937)
 Wilma Cox as various characters, usually as a mother to one of the kids (1937–1938)
 William Newell and Barbara Bedford as Alfalfa's parents (1938–1940)
 Louis Jean Heydt and Peggy Shannon as Mickey Gubitosi's parents in Dad for a Day and All About Hash (1939–1940)
 Walter Wills as Froggy's Uncle Walt in (1941–1942)

Other notable adult actors
 Will Rogers as himself/Jubilo in Jubilo Jr. (1924)
 Charley Chase as various characters (1924–1931)
 Oliver Hardy as various characters (1926–1933)
 Stan Laurel as an Englishman in Seeing the World (1927) and a baby in Wild Poses (1933)
 Stepin Fetchit as himself in A Tough Winter (1930)
 Blanche Payson as Wheezer and Dorothy's step-mother in Dogs is Dogs (1931)
 Tiny Lawrence and Major Mite as the "fidgets" in Free Eats (1932)
 Hooper Atchley as Dickie Moore's father in Birthday Blues (1932)
 John Lester Johnson as "Bumbo," the Wild Man in The Kid from Borneo (1933)
 Franklin Pangborn as Otto Phocus the photographer in Wild Poses (1933)
 Don Barclay as Barclay in Honky Donkey (1934)
 Kitty Kelly as Spanky's mother in Beginner's Luck (1935)
 Tom Dugan as the aggravated golfer in Divot Diggers (1936)
 Thomas Pogue as Mr. Jackson in Divot Diggers (1936)
 Zeffie Tilbury as the kids' adopted Grandma in Second Childhood (1936)
 Marie Blake as Aunt Penelope in Alfalfa's Aunt (1939)
 Gerard Marenghi (also known as Jerry Maren) as Light-Fingered Lester in "Tiny Troubles" (1939)
 Paul Hurst as the bus conductor in Goin' Fishin' (1940)
 Thurston Hall as Mr. Morton in Kiddie Kure (1940)
 Christian Rub as Mr. Swenson, the janitor in Come Back, Miss Pipps (1941)
 Stephen McNally as Bill Patterson in Rover's Big Chance (1942)

Crew members

Directors
 James W. Horne (When the Wind Blows)
 Ray McCarey (Free Eats)
 Robert A. McGowan (1926–1930) (Robert F.'s nephew, usually credited as "Anthony Mack")
 Robert F. McGowan (1922–1933;  Divot Diggers)
 Gus Meins (1934–1936)
 Fred Newmeyer (Our Gang, The Pinch Singer and Arbor Day, 1937 short Mail and Female, and General Spanky)
 James Parrott (Washee Ironee)
 Nate Watt (Three Men in a Tub and The Awful Tooth)
 Gordon Douglas (1936–1938) and General Spanky
MGM
 Sam Baerwitz (Calling All Kids)
 Edward L. Cahn (1939–1942; Three Smart Guys)
 Gordon Douglas (The Little Ranger, Aladdin's Lantern)
 Cy Endfield (Radio Bugs, Dancing Romeo, Tale of a Dog)
 Herbert Glazer (1942–1943)
 George Sidney (1938–1939)

Cinematographers
Norbert Brodine
Francis Corby
Ernest "Hap" Depew
Harry Forbes
Harry W. Gerstad
F.E. Hershey
Milton Krasner
Art Lloyd
Walter Lundin
Kenneth Peach
Len Powers
Robert W. Pittack
Jackson Rose
Charles Salerno Jr.
Clyde De Vinna
Charles Schoenbaum
Paul C. Vogel

Film Editors
Robert Crandall
Richard Currier
T.J. Crizer
Bert Jordan
Louis McManus
Jack Ogilvie
Ray Snyder
William Terhune
William Ziegler
Ralph E. Goldstein
Leon Bourgeau
Albert Akst

Recording Engineers/Sound
Harry Baker
W.B. Delaplain
James Greene
Elmer Raguse
Oscar Lagerstrom
William Randall
Earl Sitar

Key writers
 Frank Capra (mid-1920s)
 Charley Chase (early 1920s)
 Walter Lantz (mid-1920s)
 Hal Law (wrote most of the MGM shorts)
 Leo McCarey (early to mid-1920s)
 Robert A. McGowan (wrote most of the MGM shorts)
 Robert F. McGowan (1922–1933)
 Hal Roach (1922–mid-1930s)
 Frank Tashlin (mid-1930s)
 H. M. Walker (1922–1932)

Musicians
 Marvin Hatley
 Leroy Shield
Max Terr

References

Our Gang